Doremi Entertainment is a South Korean artist management, TV series original sound track making, and Korean drama production company.

List of works

TV series

TV series OST

Managed artists
 Kwak Min-Seok
 Jung Kyung-ho
 Kang Sang-won
 Jang Won-hyuk
 Na Hyun-Joo
 Won Hyun-joon
 Park Hyun-woo

References

External links
  

Television production companies of South Korea
Entertainment companies established in 2006
Companies based in Seoul
South Korean companies established in 2006